

Werner Schmidt-Hammer (26 September 1894 – 4 January 1962) was a German general in the Wehrmacht during World War II. He was a recipient of the Knight's Cross of the Iron Cross of Nazi Germany.

Schmidt-Hammer surrendered to the Red Army in the course of the Soviet Prague Offensive in May 1945. Convicted as a war criminal in the Soviet Union, he was held until October 1955.

Awards and decorations

 Knight's Cross of the Iron Cross on 12 September 1944 as Generalleutnant and commander of 168. Infanterie-Division

References

Citations

Bibliography

 

1894 births
1962 deaths
People from Mittelsachsen
People from the Kingdom of Saxony
Lieutenant generals of the German Army (Wehrmacht)
Military personnel from Saxony
German Army personnel of World War I
Reichswehr personnel
German prisoners of war in World War II held by the Soviet Union
Recipients of the clasp to the Iron Cross, 1st class
Recipients of the Gold German Cross
Recipients of the Knight's Cross of the Iron Cross
German Army generals of World War II